The Qishla of Kirkuk is a historical building in Kirkuk, Iraq.

According to the Ottoman Calendars, the Qishla   was built in 1863 to be the headquarters of the Ottoman army in Kirkuk. The word Qishla is a Turkish word means the place where the army stay at the winter.

According to The Union of the Turkmen Artists, The Institution of Cultural heritage in Kirkuk is planning to repair the south part of the Qishla to make it a cultural centre and a museum.

On the 8th of February 2016, 12 meters of the Qishla collapsed.

References

Buildings and structures in Kirkuk
Infrastructure completed in 1863
1863 establishments in the Ottoman Empire